Dehleez is an Indian Hindi-language television series which aired on NDTV Imagine in 2009. It was produced by Manish Goswami.

Plot 

The story revolves around how Indu manages the balance between the responsibility of being a wife and working woman at the same time.

Cast 

 Preeti Gandwani
 Bhuvnesh Mann
 Yuvraj S Singh 
  Rakesh Pandey
 Bhavna Khanna
 Preeti Sahay
 Sunil Barve
 Nishant Shokeen
 Nimai Bali
 Aarti Dave
 Geeta Tyagi as Nalini
 Trishika Tiwari
 Savita Prabhune
 Tanya Mirza
 Sujata Thakkar
 Arup Pal
 Gaurav Choudhary
 Harsh Chhaya

References 

2009 Indian television series debuts